John Patrick Dougan (22 December 1946 – 16 November 2006) was a New Zealand rugby union player. A first five-eighth, Dougan represented Wellington and Hawke's Bay at a provincial level, and was a member of the New Zealand national side, the All Blacks, from 1972 to 1973. He played 12 matches for the All Blacks including two internationals.

References

1946 births
2006 deaths
Rugby union players from Lower Hutt
People educated at St Bernard's College, Lower Hutt
New Zealand rugby union players
New Zealand international rugby union players
Wellington rugby union players
Hawke's Bay rugby union players
Rugby union fly-halves